Lucas Bundschuh (born 9 April 1996) is an Austrian footballer who plays for Eliteliga Vorarlberg club SC Admira Dornbirn.

Career

At the age of 16, Bundschuh joined the youth academy of German Bundesliga side Freiburg.

For the second half of 2016–17, he signed for Swarovski Tirol in the Austrian second division.

In 2017, he signed for German sixth division team Memmingen II.

In 2019, Bundschuh returned to Austria with Dornbirn 1913 .

References

External links
 
 

1996 births
People from Bregenz District
Footballers from Vorarlberg
Living people
Austrian footballers
Austria youth international footballers
Association football goalkeepers
SC Freiburg II players
WSG Tirol players
FC Memmingen players
FC Dornbirn 1913 players
Landesliga players
Bayernliga players
2. Liga (Austria) players
Austrian Regionalliga players
Austrian expatriate footballers
Expatriate footballers in Germany
Austrian expatriate sportspeople in Germany